Locked-in syndrome (LIS), also known as pseudocoma, is a condition in which a patient is aware but cannot move or communicate verbally due to complete paralysis of nearly all voluntary muscles in the body except for vertical eye movements and blinking. The individual is conscious and sufficiently intact cognitively to be able to communicate with eye movements. Electroencephalography results are normal in locked-in syndrome.
Total locked-in syndrome, or completely locked-in state (CLIS), is a version of locked-in syndrome wherein the eyes are paralyzed as well. Fred Plum and Jerome B. Posner coined the term for this disorder in 1966.

Signs and symptoms
Locked-in syndrome is usually characterized by quadriplegia (loss of limb function) and the inability to speak in otherwise cognitively intact individuals. Those with locked-in syndrome may be able to communicate with others through coded messages by blinking or moving their eyes, which are often not affected by the paralysis. The symptoms are similar to those of sleep paralysis.  Patients who have locked-in syndrome are conscious and aware, with no loss of cognitive function. They can sometimes retain proprioception and sensation throughout their bodies. Some patients may have the ability to move certain facial muscles, and most often some or all of the extraocular muscles. Individuals with the  syndrome lack coordination between breathing and voice.  This prevents them from producing voluntary sounds, though the vocal cords themselves may not be paralysed.

Causes

Unlike persistent vegetative state, in which the upper portions of the brain are damaged and the lower portions are spared, locked-in syndrome is essentially the opposite, caused by damage to specific portions of the lower brain and brainstem, with no damage to the upper brain. Injuries to the pons are the most common cause of locked-in syndrome.

Possible causes of locked-in syndrome include:
 Poisoning cases – More frequently from a krait bite and other neurotoxic venoms, as they cannot usually cross the blood–brain barrier
 Brainstem stroke
 Diseases of the circulatory system
 Medication overdose
 Damage to nerve cells, particularly destruction of the myelin sheath, caused by disease or osmotic demyelination syndrome (formerly designated central pontine myelinolysis) secondary to excessively rapid correction of hyponatremia [>1 mEq/L/h])
 A stroke or brain hemorrhage, usually of the basilar artery
 Traumatic brain injury
 Result from lesion of the brain-stem

Curare poisoning mimics a total locked-in syndrome by causing paralysis of all voluntarily controlled skeletal muscles. The respiratory muscles are also paralyzed, but the victim can be kept alive by artificial respiration.

Diagnosis
Locked-in syndrome can be difficult to diagnose. In a 2002 survey of 44 people with LIS, it took almost three months to recognize and diagnose the condition after it had begun. Locked-in syndrome may mimic loss of consciousness in patients, or, in the case that respiratory control is lost, may even resemble death. People are also unable to actuate standard motor responses such as withdrawal from pain; as a result, testing often requires making requests of the patient such as blinking or vertical eye movement.

Brain imaging may provide additional indicators of locked-in syndrome, as brain imaging provides clues as to whether or not brain function has been lost. Additionally, an EEG can allow the observation of sleep-wake patterns indicating that the patient is not unconscious but simply unable to move.

Similar conditions 
 Amyotrophic lateral sclerosis (ALS)
 Bilateral brainstem tumors
 Brain death (of the whole brain or the brain stem or other part)
 Coma (deep or irreversible)
 Guillain–Barré syndrome
 Myasthenia gravis
 Poliomyelitis
 Polyneuritis
 Vegetative state (chronic or otherwise)

Treatment
Neither a standard treatment nor a cure is available. Stimulation of muscle reflexes with electrodes (NMES) has been known to help patients regain some muscle function. Other courses of treatment are often symptomatic. Assistive computer interface technologies such as Dasher, combined with eye tracking, may be used to help people with LIS communicate with their environment.

Prognosis
It is extremely rare for any significant motor function to return, with the majority of locked-in syndrome patients never regaining motor control. However, some people with the condition continue to live for extended periods of time, while in exceptional cases, like that of Kerry Pink, Gareth Shepherd, Jacob Haendel, Kate Allatt, and Jessica Wegbrans, a near-full recovery may be achieved with intensive physical therapy.

Research
New brain–computer interfaces (BCIs) may provide future remedies. One effort in 2002 allowed a fully locked-in patient to answer yes-or-no questions. In 2006, researchers created and successfully tested a neural interface which allowed someone with locked-in syndrome to operate a web browser. Some scientists have reported that they have developed a technique that allows locked-in patients to communicate via sniffing.
For the first time in 2020, a 34-year-old German patient, paralyzed since 2015 (later also the eyeballs) managed to communicate through an implant capable of  reading brain activity.

See also
 Akinetic mutism
 List of people with locked-in syndrome
 The Diving Bell and the Butterfly: memoirs of journalist Jean-Dominique Bauby about his life with the condition
 Johnny Got His Gun, novel about a soldier who loses all of his limbs and senses after being wounded fighting in WWI

References

25. Injuries to the pons are the most common cause of locked-in syndrome,Harrison’s principles of internal medicine 21st edition vol 2 page 3332.

Further reading
 Piotr Kniecicki (2014). An Art of Graceful Dying. Lukasz Swiderski  (Autobiography, written with residual wrist movements and specially adapted computer)

External links 

Neurotrauma
Syndromes